Merited Artist or Honored Artist is an honorary title in the Soviet Union, Russian Federation, Union Republics, and autonomous republics, also in some other Eastern Bloc states, as well as in a number of post-Soviet states. Specifically, the term may refer to:

 Merited Artist (Albania)
 Merited Artist of the Russian Federation
 Merited Artist of Ukraine
 Merited Artist of Vietnam
 Merited Artist of Czechoslovakia
Honored Artist of Armenia
Honored Artist of the Byelorussian SSR
Honored Artist of the RSFSR

See also

Merited Artists